The Cao Lãnh Stadium or officially Sân vận động Cao Lãnh is a multi-use stadium in Cao Lãnh, Vietnam.  It is currently used mostly for football matches and is the home stadium of Đồng Tháp F.C. of the V-League.  The stadium holds 23,000 spectators.

References

External links
Stadium information

Football venues in Vietnam
Buildings and structures in Đồng Tháp province